Catskill Creek is a  tributary of the Hudson River that drains the northeastern Catskill Mountains of the U.S. State of New York.  From its source at Franklinton Vlaie in Schoharie County it flows southeast through parts of Albany County and Greene County to its mouth at the village of Catskill on the Hudson River.

Like Fishkill Creek, Catskill Creek is tautological, literally repeating "creek" twice, as kill is Dutch for "creek".

Tributaries
Lake Creek
Fox Creek
Potter Hollow Creek
Tenmile Creek
Eightmile Creek
Thorpe Creek
Cornwallville Creek
Fall Creek
Bowery Creek
Basic Creek—May be a corruption of a Mahican word meaning "valley".
Platte Kill
Shingle Kill
Jan De Bakkers Kill
Bell Brook
Potic Creek—likely from a Mahican name referring to a waterfall or set of rapids.
 Cob Creek
 Grapeville Creek
 West Medway Creek
Lake Brook
Kaaterskill Creek
Beaver Kill
Kiskatom Brook—from a Mahican name referring to the shagbark hickory tree.
 Hans Vosen Kill

See also
List of rivers of New York

References

External links
 Bedford Fine Art Gallery: A Catskill Creek by Frank Anderson

Catskill, New York
Catskills
Rivers of Albany County, New York
Rivers of Greene County, New York
Rivers of New York (state)
Rivers of Schoharie County, New York
Tributaries of the Hudson River